Pattranite Limpatiyakorn (born 23 May 2000), nicknamed Love, is a Thai actress.

Pattranite became an actress under GMMTV after passing an audition in 2018. After He's Coming to Me (2019) and 2gether: The Series (2020), she has also been acclaimed for her girls' love role in the series Bad Buddy (2021).

Life

Pattranite was born on 23 May 2000. She is the first child of her father and mother, for which reason her father nicknamed her "Love". Pattranite has one younger brother and one younger sister.

For secondary education, Pattranite attended Mater Dei School, where she took a French language program as she wanted to become a diplomat. Upon graduation from the school, she attended the College of Social Communication Innovation, Srinakharinwirot University, where she majored in performing arts (acting and directing for cinema). She graduated from the university in 2022.

Career

Prior to becoming an actress, Pattranite used to work as a model for magazines and star in television commercials, for which she first attended a casting call during the fifth year of her secondary education. In 2018, she took part in an audition called Go On Girl Star Search, organised by GMMTV and Clean & Clear to recruit new actresses. After passing the audition, she has since become an actress under GMMTV. Her first performance is a role in the series He's Coming to Me (2019), followed by a role in the series Blacklist (2019).

She began to gain recognition due to her performance in the series 2gether: The Series (2020). She reprised the same role in its spin-offs, Still 2gether (2020) and 2gether: The Movie (2021).

In 2021, the girls' love role of "Pa" performed by her in the series Bad Buddy, in which she was paired up with "Ink", played by Pansa Vosbein, received acclaimed reviews, sending the hashtag "#อิ๊งภา" ("#InkPa") trending on social media. Pattranite and Pansa continued to take girls' love roles together in a number of series, including Vice Versa (2022), Magic of Zero (2022), and 23.5 (2023).

In 2020, she also launched her own cosmetic brand called "Twenty Wendy".

Filmography

Series

Films

Music videos

Awards

References

2000 births
Living people
Pattranite Limpatiyakorn
Pattranite Limpatiyakorn
Pattranite Limpatiyakorn
Pattranite Limpatiyakorn
Pattranite Limpatiyakorn